Hakea incrassata, commonly known as marble hakea, is a shrub in the family  Proteacea and is endemic to Western Australia.

Description
The branchlets have white flattened and matted fine hairs. It blooms from June to November and produces white-cream-pink flowers. Each axillary inflorescence is usually found arising from old wood and contains 6 to 16 flowers.

Taxonomy and naming
Hakea incrassata  was first formally described by the botanist Robert Brown in 1830 as part of the work Supplementum primum prodromi florae Novae Hollandiae. The only known synonym is Hakea leucadendron as described by Carl Meissner.
The specific epithet is from the Latin word crassatus meaning thickened. It is not known what is being referred to but it is thought it could be in reference to the stalk that the fruit is supported by.

Distribution and habitat
Marble hakea is endemic throughout a large area of the Wheatbelt, Great Southern and Goldfields-Esperance regions of Western Australia from Northampton in the north west to Ravensthorpe in the south east. It is found in open low heath communities where it is found in sandy or gravelly soils around or over laterite or granite.

References

incrassata
Eudicots of Western Australia
Plants described in 1830
Taxa named by Robert Brown (botanist, born 1773)